REEM is the latest prototype humanoid robot built by PAL Robotics in Spain. It is a 1.70 m high humanoid robot with 22 degrees of freedom, with a mobile base with wheels, allowing it to move at 4 km/hour. The upper part of the robot consists of a torso with a touch screen, two motorized arms, which give it a high degree of expression, and a head, which is also motorized.

REEM-A and REEM-B are the first and second prototypes of humanoid robots created by PAL Robotics. REEM-B can recognize, grasp and lift objects and walk by itself, avoiding obstacles through simultaneous localization and mapping. The robot accepts voice commands and can recognize faces.

Specifications

See also
 ASIMO
 Atlas
 HUBO
 Humanoid robot
 iCub
 Nao
 QRIO
 Robonaut

References

External links
 
 Official Blog
 Official REEM-C microsite

Bipedal humanoid robots
2005 robots
Robots of Spain
2008 robots